Asthenoctenus is a genus of South American wandering spiders first described by Eugène Simon in 1897.

Species
 it contains six species:
Asthenoctenus borellii Simon, 1897 (type) – Brazil, Uruguay, Paraguay, Argentina
Asthenoctenus bulimus (Strand, 1909) – Brazil
Asthenoctenus hingstoni (Mello-Leitão, 1948) – Guyana
Asthenoctenus longistylus Brescovit & Simó, 1998 – Brazil
Asthenoctenus tarsalis (F. O. Pickard-Cambridge, 1902) – Brazil
Asthenoctenus tigrinus Mello-Leitão, 1938 – Argentina

References

Araneomorphae genera
Ctenidae
Spiders of South America
Taxa named by Eugène Simon